General elections were held in Nicaragua on 6 November 2016 to elect the President, the National Assembly and members of the Central American Parliament. Incumbent President Daniel Ortega of the Sandinista National Liberation Front (FSLN) was re-elected for a third consecutive term amid charges he and the FSLN used their control of state resources to bypass constitutional term limits and hamstring political rivals. The FSLN benefited from strong economic growth and relatively low levels of crime compared to neighbouring countries.

According to the official results, Ortega was reelected with more than 70% of the votes. However, the election was questioned by the opposition due to the dismissal of sixteen opposition deputies months prior to the election and the complaints of both electoral fraud and voter intimidation.

Background
Four months before the elections, the Nicaraguan Supreme Court removed the disputed Independent Liberal Party (PLI) leader Eduardo Montealegre from office, decreeing that Pedro Reyes was the leader of the PLI. After 16 deputies from the PLI and its Sandinista Renovation Movement ally objected, the Supreme Electoral Council ordered them removed from the National Assembly and empowered Reyes to select their replacements.

Electoral system
The president was elected using first-past-the-post voting.

The 90 elected members of the National Assembly were elected by two methods; 20 members were elected from a single nationwide constituency, whilst 70 members were elected from 17 multi-member constituencies ranging in size from 2 to 19 seats. Both types of election were carried out using closed list proportional representation with no electoral threshold. A further two seats were reserved for the runner-up in the presidential election and the outgoing president (or their vice president).

Lists of candidates to the National Assembly and to the Central American Parliament had to be composed of 50% male and 50% female candidates.

Conduct
In June 2016 Ortega announced international observers would not be allowed to oversee the elections. The Carter Center termed this "an attack on the international community... We...lament this decision to ignore a key portion of Nicaragua's own electoral law."  However, less than two weeks before the elections, the Organization of American States accepted an invitation to send a delegation "to meet with experts and state bodies involved in the electoral process" from 5–7 November.

According to the official results, Ortega was reelected with more than 70% of the votes. However, the election was questioned by the opposition due to the dismissal of the opposition deputies, the lack of international observers and the complaints of both electoral fraud and voter intimidation.

Results

President
Ortega was widely expected to win due to the popularity of his social programmes and because he faced no obvious political challenger.

National Assembly

List of elected deputies

Central American Parliament

References

Presidential elections in Nicaragua
Nicaragua
General
Elections in Nicaragua
Nicaragua
Election and referendum articles with incomplete results